Rottenburg may refer to:

 Rottenburg am Neckar, Baden-Württemberg, Germany
 Rottenburg an der Laaber, Bavaria, Germany
 Rothenburg ob der Tauber, Bavaria, Germany
 Francis de Rottenburg (1757–1832), Polish-born soldier and administrator

See also 
 Rotenberg (disambiguation)
 Rotenburg (disambiguation)
 Rothenberg, Hesse, Germany
 Rothenburg (disambiguation)
 Rottenburgh family